Borodinia may refer to:
 Borodinia (plant), a genus of flowering plants in the family Brassicaceae 
 , a genus of foraminifers in the family